Leroy Lewis (born 22 September 1963) is a Dominican cricketer. He played in one first-class match for the Windward Islands in 1991/92.

See also
 List of Windward Islands first-class cricketers

References

External links
 

1963 births
Living people
Dominica cricketers
Windward Islands cricketers